The Canary damsel (Similiparma lurida) is a species of marine fish of the family Pomacentridae. It lives primary in shallow, subtropical waters of the Atlantic Ocean, and is sometimes also known as the Cape Verde gregory, which is also a common name of Stegastes imbricatus.

Description
Each fish has large eyes, with coloring that is black to brownish black with blue on the fins, and lighter colors on the ventral part of the body. Juveniles may have lateral stripes on their bodies as well. During their mating season, adults exhibit sexual dimorphism.

Distribution and habitat
Canary damsels are commonly associated with reefs in subtropical regions, where individuals grow to around 15 cm in length, and feed primarily on algae and small invertebrates.

Canary damsels inhabit rocky areas, where they lay eggs that are defended by males. The young can be found along the coast, especially in tide pools.

Relationship with humans
The Canary damsel is sometimes harvested for use in saltwater aquaria, albeit on a very small scale. Its total population size is unknown and it faces no known threats from humans aside from its infrequent use in the aquarium trade. It is also found in many marine protected regions. This fact, together with a non-fragmented range, and no evidence of population decline, has led the IUCN to classify the Canary damsel as "Least Concern."

References

External links
 

Canary damsel
Fauna of Macaronesia
Fauna of the Azores
Vertebrates of the Canary Islands
Fauna of the Gambia
Fauna of Madeira
Canary damsel
Canary damsel